Michelin stars are a rating system used by the red Michelin Guide to grade restaurants on their quality. The guide was originally developed in 1900 to show French drivers where local amenities such as restaurants and mechanics were. The rating system was first introduced in 1926 as a single star, with the second and third stars introduced in 1933. According to the Guide, one star signifies "a very good restaurant", two stars are "excellent cooking that is worth a detour", and three stars mean "exceptional cuisine that is worth a special journey". The listing of starred restaurants is updated once a year.

Summary
The 2022 Michelin Guides list 142 restaurants with 3 Michelin stars.

List of Michelin 3-star restaurants by country in the latest version

Austria

Belgium

China

Denmark

France and Monaco

Germany

Hong Kong and Macau

Italy

Japan

Netherlands

Norway

Singapore

South Korea

Spain

Sweden

Switzerland

Taiwan

United Kingdom

United States

See also 
 List of Michelin starred restaurants in Chicago
 List of Michelin starred restaurants in Florida
 List of Michelin starred restaurants in Ireland
 List of Michelin starred restaurants in Los Angeles and Southern California
 List of Michelin starred restaurants in the Netherlands
 List of Michelin starred restaurants in New York City
 List of Michelin starred restaurants in San Francisco Bay Area
 List of Michelin starred restaurants in Scotland
 List of Michelin starred restaurants in Singapore
 List of Michelin starred restaurants in Thailand
 List of Michelin 3-star restaurants in the United Kingdom
 List of Michelin 3-star restaurants in the United States
 List of Michelin starred restaurants in Washington, D.C.
 List of female chefs with Michelin stars

References

External links 
 
 The Michelin Guide
 The Staff Canteen

Michelin Guide
Lists of restaurants